Yuri Valeryanovich Antonovich (born 2 June 1967) is a Belarusian professional football coach and a former player.

Honours
Dinamo Minsk
 Belarusian Premier League champion: 1992, 1992–93.
 Belarusian Cup winner: 1992.

European club competitions
 UEFA Cup 1988–89 with Dinamo Minsk: 2 games.
 UEFA Champions League 1992–93 with PFC CSKA Moscow: 4 games.
 UEFA Cup Winners' Cup 1994–95 with PFC CSKA Moscow: 1 game.

External links
 

1967 births
Living people
Soviet footballers
Belarusian footballers
Belarus international footballers
Belarusian football managers
Belarusian Premier League players
FC Dinamo Minsk players
PFC CSKA Moscow players
Russian Premier League players
FC Rostov players
FC Dynamo Brest players
FC Slavia Mozyr players
FC Energetik-BGU Minsk players
Belarusian expatriate footballers
Expatriate footballers in Russia
FC Zvezda-BGU Minsk managers
Association football midfielders
Footballers from Saint Petersburg